The Vermilion River is a  tributary of the Illinois River in the state of Illinois, United States. The river flows north, in contrast to a second Vermilion River in Illinois, which flows south to the Wabash River. The Illinois and Wabash rivers each have a tributary named the Little Vermilion River as well.

The north-flowing Vermilion River and the south-flowing Middle Fork Vermilion River run on what is close to a straight line between Oglesby and Danville. In presettlement times, the two rivers drained an upland marsh near Roberts. It is possible that early settlers regarded these as a single river that flowed in two directions. It is also possible that, in early settlement times, these rivers formed a canoe route between the Illinois River and Wabash River, with a portage through the marshes near Roberts. This may explain why the two rivers have the same name.

The north-flowing Vermilion flows in a northerly direction from its origin in Livingston and Ford counties in north central Illinois, eventually emptying into the Illinois River, near Oglesby. Perhaps it is best known for its stretch of whitewater between Lowell and Oglesby, Illinois, which is one of few found in Illinois.

Access to a stretch of river around a dam owned by Buzzi Unicem was temporarily barred in 2009 after two drowning deaths that occurred on June 23 and 26, respectively, as well as numerous other boating accidents. The river access was reopened in 2010.

Cities and towns
The following cities and towns are drained by the Vermilion:
Chatsworth
Chenoa
Cornell
Fairbury
Forrest
Long Point
Piper City
Pontiac
Streator

Counties
The following counties are drained at least in part by the Vermilion River: 
Ford
Iroquois
LaSalle
Livingston
McLean
Woodford

Parks and access points
Matthiessen State Park
Sandy Ford Nature Preserve
Play Park, Pontiac
https://www.pontiac.org/594/Play-Park

Humiston Woods
http://www.humistonwoods.org/

Township park, 
Dropped pin
Near Pontiac Township, IL 61764
https://goo.gl/maps/DJGbKhYgceDTR3AU6

See also
List of Illinois rivers

References

External links
American Whitewater, Vermilion River
USGS/American Whitewater Stream Gage
Canoe the Vermilion, Streator, Illinois
Prairie Rivers Network
Vermillion River Rafting, Lowell, Illinois

Rivers of Illinois
Tributaries of the Illinois River
Rivers of Livingston County, Illinois
Rivers of Ford County, Illinois
Rivers of Iroquois County, Illinois
Rivers of LaSalle County, Illinois
Rivers of McLean County, Illinois
Rivers of Woodford County, Illinois